World of Darkness is a series of tabletop role-playing games by White Wolf Publishing, and the name of their shared setting. Several of the tabletop games – primarily Vampire: The Masquerade and Hunter: The Reckoning – have been adapted into video games by different developers, covering genres including role-playing games, action games, and adventure games. Critical reception of the games has varied, ranging from average to positive, with Vampire: The Masquerade – Bloodlines standing out, being described by video game publications as a cult classic and a "flawed masterpiece".

Video game adaptations of the series began in the 1990s with unreleased Werewolf: The Apocalypse and Mage: The Ascension games; the first released video game in the series was Vampire: The Masquerade – Redemption in 2000, which was followed by three Hunter games in 2002–2003, and Bloodlines in 2004. No further World of Darkness video games were released in over a decade, during which another Werewolf project and the online game World of Darkness were started and canceled, until 2017's World of Darkness Preludes, which was based on Vampire and Mage. Since then, several video games have been developed, including two Werewolf games, two Wraith: The Oblivion games, Bloodlines 2, and other Vampire games.

Vampire: The Masquerade

Hunter: The Reckoning

Others

Canceled games

References

External links
 

World of Darkness